Renildo Martins da Silva (born 20 August 1989), known as Da Silva, is a Brazilian footballer who plays for Operário–MS as defender

Career statistics

References

External links

1989 births
Living people
Brazilian footballers
Association football defenders
Campeonato Brasileiro Série A players
Campeonato Brasileiro Série D players
Tocantinópolis Esporte Clube players
Goiás Esporte Clube players
Guarani FC players
Paulista Futebol Clube players
Clube Recreativo e Atlético Catalano players
Esporte Clube Cruzeiro players
Associação Desportiva Bahia de Feira players
Associação Ferroviária de Esportes players
Guarany Sporting Club players
América Futebol Clube (GO) players
Clube Desportivo Sete de Setembro players
Operário Futebol Clube (MS) players
Sportspeople from Tocantins